In United States legislation,  and  are companion bipartisan bills that eliminate prompt pay discounts from the calculation of Average Sales Price (ASP), which is the basis for Medicare drug reimbursement rates for community cancer clinics. S. 1221 was introduced by Senators Arlen Specter (D-PA) and Pat Roberts (R-KS).

H.R. 1392 was introduced by Representatives Gene Green (D-TX), Ed Whitfield (R-KY), Mike Ross (D-AR), Ed Towns (D-NY), Diana DeGette (D-CO), Mike Rogers (R-MI), Betty Sutton (D-OH), Bart Gordon (D-TN), Lee Terry (R-NE) and Ralph Hall (R-TX) and has close to 50 cosponsors.

S.1221 and H.R. 1392 will amend title XVIII of the Social Security Act to ensure more appropriate payment amounts for drugs and biologicals under Part B of the Medicare Program by excluding customary prompt pay discounts extended to wholesalers from the manufacturer's Average Sales Price (ASP). Prompt pay discounts are provided by pharmaceutical manufacturers to drug distributors.

Because they are financing terms between manufacturers and distributors, prompt pay discounts are not passed on to community cancer clinics. However, the Medicare Modernization Act of 2003 (MMA) required that prompt pay discounts be included in the calculation of ASP. Their inclusion artificially reduces Medicare reimbursement rates by approximately 2%.

Currently the prompt pay discounts artificially reduce Medicare Part B drug reimbursement rates for community oncology clinics, jeopardizing the viability of these providers. Additionally, prompt pay discounts also reduce the payment rates of private payers that use ASP. The bill is a step forward in addressing problems with Medicare reimbursement for cancer drugs.

Excluding distributor prompt pay discounts from the ASP methodology is consistent with existing policy and will create greater uniformity among federal healthcare programs, as these terms already are excluded from the Medicaid Average Manufacturer Price (AMP) methodology.

Healthcare reform legislation in the United States
Medicare and Medicaid (United States)